Sätila is a locality situated in Mark Municipality, Västra Götaland County, Sweden. It had 1,059 inhabitants in 2010. It is located at the shore of lake Lygnern.

References 

Populated places in Västra Götaland County
Populated places in Mark Municipality